Bactra furfurana, the mottled marble, is a moth of the family Tortricidae described by Adrian Hardy Haworth in 1811. It is found in the Nearctic and Palearctic realms.

The moth has a wingspan of 13–19 mm. Its habitat is damp marshy regions with adults flying in June and July. Adults are very similar to Bactra lancealana. Meyrick describes it - Forewings slightly narrower than in Bactra lancealana, costa straighter; light ochreous or ochreous-brownish, indistinctly darker-strigulated; basal patch, central fascia, and an apical streak darker ochreous or brown, indistinct, sometimes nearly obsolete. Hindwings are grey. The larva is shining green; head black, with a whitish line; plate of 2 dark brown. Julius von Kennel provides a full description. 

The larvae feed within the stems of various rushes, such as Schoenoplectus lacustris and Juncus conglomeratus, hollowing out the stem.

References 

Moths described in 1811
Bactrini